Sporten klub Ticha is a defunct Bulgarian sports club, from Varna, one of predecessors of Cherno More Varna.

History
Ticha was created on 3 March 1913 as Galata. In 24 May 1914 the club was merged with Sportist (founded in 1909). The mid and late thirties were the club's strongest years, as it won the Bulgarian championship once, in the 1937–38 season, after being runners-up twice, in seasons 1935 and 1936. On 18 February 1945, the club was merged with Vladislav Varna, and a new club was formed on their basis – TV 45, whose descendant today is Cherno More Varna.

Honours
Bulgarian State Football Championship
Winners (1): 1937–38
Runners-up (2): 1935, 1936

References

Notes

Association football clubs established in 1914
Association football clubs disestablished in 1945
Vladislav
Football clubs in Bulgaria
Defunct football clubs in Bulgaria
1914 establishments in Bulgaria